Deuterotinea casanella is a moth in the Eriocottidae family. It was described by Eduard Friedrich Eversmann in 1844. It is found in Romania, Ukraine and southern Russia.

References

Moths described in 1844
Eriocottidae
Moths of Europe